The Aïn Barbar mine is a large open pit mine in the south-eastern Algeria in Tamanrasset Province. Aïn Barbar represents one of the largest feldspar reserves in Algeria having estimated reserves of 7 million tonnes of ore.

References 

Feldspar mines in Algeria